The Lace Market Theatre is a small, independent amateur theatre in Nottingham, England. It is owned and operated by The Lace Market Theatre Trust Ltd, which is a registered charity.

History

Origins: 1920s to 1951

The Lace Market Theatre developed from two amateur dramatic societies founded in Nottingham in the 1920s: the Nottingham Playgoers Club (1922) and the Nottingham Philodramatic Society (1926). These societies amalgamated in 1946 to become the Nottingham Theatre Club, which was based at the Nottingham Bluecoat School until 1951.

Hutchison Street: 1951 to 1972

In 1951, the Nottingham Theatre Club moved to leased premises in Hutchinson Street, much closer to Nottingham city centre. It remained there until 1972, when it left as part of the major slum clearance and redevelopment of the city during that decade. At this point, members raised the money to purchase a dilapidated paint store in Halifax Place in the Lace Market area of the city.

Halifax Place: 1972 to date

The paint store was originally built as a chapel in 1761. It later became a school, where William Booth (founder of the Salvation Army) was a pupil. The building is now Grade II-listed.

Tight funds meant the majority of renovation works were carried out by the Club’s members themselves. The result, achieved within a year, was a 118-seat auditorium with space in the upstairs bar for studio performances to smaller audiences. The Club’s objective (which remains to this day) was to stage plays that were challenging for the actors and technical crews, and which people would otherwise have had to travel to London to see.

‘Training by doing’ has always been a part of the Club’s ethos. Small-scale productions were regularly staged in the bar area so that first-time directors could cut their teeth. These productions were known as ‘Fents’ — an homage to the textile-making history of the Lace Market area.

In 1977, the opportunity arose for the Club to acquire more land. To facilitate the raising of funds, the Lace Market Theatre Trust Ltd was formed. £40,000 was initially raised for a three-storey extension at the rear of the building; and a further £40,000 was raised for its completion in 1984. The building was owned by the Trust and leased to the Club.

While the Club continued to stage challenging pieces, the Trust pursued charitable and educational aims by giving grants to students who were going on to study at drama school.

By 2000, the Club’s extensive wardrobe had moved into rented premises, first in St. Mary's Gate and then in Stoney Street.

The Club merged into the Trust in 2003.

New development plans are currently underway, with the aim of creating a landmark amateur theatre for the region.

Patrons
Shortly after the completion of the extension in 1984, Prunella Scales and Timothy West became patrons of the theatre. In 2012, Matthew Macfadyen and Keeley Hawes also became patrons. Joyce Redman was a patron for many years until her death in 2012.

Links with German theatres
The Lace Market Theatre has been twinned with the  Jakobus Theatre and Die Kaeuze in Germany since 1982. Currently, the Lace Market Theatre hosts both German theatres across two weeks in one year; then, two years later, the two German theatres host one production each over one week.

Notes and references

External links
 Lace Market Theatre - official site
 Little Theatre Guild - Lace Market Theatre

Grade II* listed buildings in Nottinghamshire
Theatres in Nottingham